= 6th GMA Dove Awards =

1974 US music awards ceremony

- Date: 1974
- Location: Nashville, Tennessee

The 6th Annual GMA Dove Awards were held on 1974 recognizing accomplishments of musicians for the year 1973. The show was held in Nashville, Tennessee.
